According to the Biblical Narrative, Obed was a son of Boaz and Ruth, the father of Jesse, and the grandfather of David. He is named as one of Jesus' ancestors in the genealogies recorded in the Gospel of Matthew and the Gospel of Luke.

References

Book of Ruth
Gospel of Luke
Gospel of Matthew
Hebrew Bible people
Tribe of Judah